The Crazy Companies is a 1988 Hong Kong comedy film directed by Wong Jing, and starring Andy Lau and Natalis Chan. It was followed by a sequel, The Crazy Companies II, which was released in 1989.

Summary
When Tsui Tung Kwai (Andy Lau), a young Hong-Kong man trying to make it in America as a film extra learns that his father has died and left half of his fortune to him and he travels back to Hong-Kong.  Upon arrival he learns that the money comes with the proviso that he must work his way up in the company for 6 months without getting into trouble; unbeknownst to him, his stepbrother has hired the 3 worst managers in the company to try to bring him down.

Cast
 Andy Lau - Tsui Tung Kwai
 Natalis Chan - Tam Sad-Chiu
 Stanley Fung - Frank
 Idy Chan - Joanne
 Chingmy Yau - Kimmy
 Sandra Ng - Doriana
 Joan Tong Lai-Kau - Happy
 Charlie Cho - Kim
 Hui Ying-Sau - Uncle
 Law Ching-Ho - Supervisor of Office Boys
 Law Ho-Kai - Joanne's friend
 Shing Fui-On - Big Brother
 James Wong - Priest
 Wong Jing - Cameo
 Yung Sai-Kit - Tsui Ting-Fu

See also
Andy Lau filmography
Wong Jing filmography

References

External links
 IMDb listing

1988 films
1988 comedy films
Hong Kong comedy films
Films directed by Wong Jing
1980s Cantonese-language films
1980s Hong Kong films